Vinícius Rodrigues Tomaz da Silva Almeida (born 26 June 1983) is a Brazilian footballer.

Biography
Born in Dias d'Ávila, Bahia, Vinícius started his career with Vitória, located in Salvador, the state capital. In September 2005, he was signed by Atlético Mineiro and played a season for the club at 2005 Campeonato Brasileiro Série A. In January 2006 he was signed by Iraty (de facto controlled by investment company) and immediately borrowed by Avaí for a year. He played 2006 and Campeonato Catarinense and 2006 Campeonato Brasileiro Série B for the club.

In January 2007, he was loaned to Santos along with Pedro. After winning Campeonato Paulista and played twice at 2007 Campeonato Brasileiro Série A, he was loaned to Avaí for another year.

In January 2009, he was transferred to América de Natal but released in August, after played nil at 2009 Campeonato Brasileiro Série B. In January 2010 he signed a 4 months contract with Bahia de Feira and released after the end of Campeonato Baiano.

Honours
Campeonato Paulista: 2007

References

External links
 Futpedia 
 CBF 

Brazilian footballers
Esporte Clube Vitória players
Clube Atlético Mineiro players
Iraty Sport Club players
Avaí FC players
Santos FC players
América Futebol Clube (RN) players
Association football midfielders
Sportspeople from Bahia
1983 births
Living people